The Conjugal Bed is a 1963 Italian comedy film directed by Marco Ferreri. It was entered into the 1963 Cannes Film Festival where Marina Vlady won the award for Best Actress.

Plot
A wealthy car dealer called Alfonso decides to get married with Regina, a quiet devoted Catholic girl, introduced to him by a friend. After the wedding, she reveals having a strong sexual appetite but only aimed at conceiving a baby. After getting pregnant the bride loses any interest in Alfonso.

Cast
 Ugo Tognazzi as Alfonso
 Marina Vlady as Regina
 Walter Giller as Father Bariaco
 Linda Sini as Mother Superior
 Riccardo Fellini as Riccardo
 Igi Polidoro as Igi
 Nino Vingelli
 Achille Majeroni as Aunt Mafalda

References

External links

1963 films
1963 comedy films
Italian comedy films
1960s Italian-language films
Films set in Rome
Italian black-and-white films
Films directed by Marco Ferreri
Films with screenplays by Rafael Azcona
1960s Italian films